Verkhneborovaya is a rural locality (a selo) in Sosnovsky Selsoviet of Seryshevsky District, Amur Oblast, Russia. The population was 36 as of 2018. There is 1 street.

Geography 
It is located 50 km from Seryshevo, 19 km from Sosnovka.

References 

Rural localities in Seryshevsky District